"Through the Gates of the Silver Key" is a short story co-written by American writers H. P. Lovecraft and E. Hoffmann Price between October 1932 and April 1933. A sequel to Lovecraft's "The Silver Key", and part of a sequence of stories focusing on Randolph Carter, it was first published in the July 1934 issue of Weird Tales.

Plot
At a gathering to decide the fate of Randolph Carter's estate (which has been held in trust since his disappearance) the mysterious Swami Chandraputra, who wears curious mittens and enveloping robes, tells Carter's acquaintances of his ultimate fate. He explains that the key took Carter to a type of higher dimension. There, Carter, on an ill-defined mission (or out of sheer curiosity), travelled strange sections of the cosmos by first meeting with 'Umr at-Tawil, a dangerous being warned of in the Necronomicon, saying those who deal with it never return. 'Umr at-Tawil offers Carter a chance to plunge deeper into the cosmos; Carter thus perceives the true nature of the universe before passing through the "Ultimate Gate."

After passing through the Ultimate Gate, Carter (now reduced to a disembodied facet of himself) encounters an Entity, implied to be Yog-Sothoth itself. This being explains that all conscious beings are facets of much greater beings, which exist outside the traditional model of three dimensions. Carter himself, and indeed all of the infinite Space-Time continuums, is a facet of this particular being, the Supreme Archetype, made up of the greatest thinkers of the universe. The Entity, appearing to be proud of Carter's accomplishments, offers to grant him a wish relating to the many facets of which it is a part. Carter explains that he would love to know more about the facets of a particular long-extinct race on a distant planet, Yaddith, which is constantly threatened by the monstrous Dholes. He has been having persistent dreams about Yaddith in the last few months. The Supreme Archetype accomplishes this by transferring Carter's consciousness into the body of one of his facets among that race, that of Zkauba the wizard, though not before warning Carter to have memorized all his symbols and rites. Carter arrogantly believes that the Silver Key alone will accomplish this claim, but it soon transpires Carter's wish was a mistake; he cannot escape, and is trapped in Zkauba's body. The two beings find each other repugnant, but are now trapped in the same body, periodically changing dominance.

After a vast amount of time trapped on Yaddith, Carter finds a means of suppressing the alien mind with drugs, and then uses their technology, along with the Silver Key to return both to the present and to Earth, where Carter can retrieve his manuscript with the symbols he needs to work on regaining his original body. Once there, the Swami reports, Carter did find the manuscript and promptly contacted Swami Chandraputra, instructing him to go to the meeting to say he would soon be along to reclaim his estate and to continue to hold it in trust. After the Swami finishes the tale, one in the party, the lawyer Aspinwall (who is Carter's cousin), accuses Swami Chandraputra of telling a false tale in an attempt to steal the estate, claiming that he is some kind of conman in a disguise. As Aspinwall tears at the Swami's masklike face and beard, it is revealed that the Swami is not human at all, but Carter, still trapped in Zkauba's hideous body. The other witnesses don't see Carter/Zkauba's true face, but Aspinwall suffers a fatal heart attack. The crisis causes Zkauba's mind to reassert itself, and the alien wizard enters a curious, coffin-shaped clock (implied to be Carter/Zkauba's means of transport to Earth) and disappears.

The tale ends with a vague postscript, speculating that the Swami was merely a common criminal who hypnotized the others to escape. However, the postscript notes, some of the story's details seem eerily accurate.

Inspiration
The story has its origins in Price's enthusiasm for an earlier Lovecraft tale. "One of my favorite HPL stories was, and still is, 'The Silver Key'," Price wrote in a 1944 memoir. "In telling him of the pleasure I had had in rereading it, I suggested a sequel to account for [protagonist] Randolph Carter's doings after his disappearance." After convincing an apparently reluctant Lovecraft to agree to collaborate on such a sequel, Price wrote a 6,000-word draft in August 1932; in April 1933, Lovecraft produced a 14,000-word version that left unchanged, by Price's estimate, "fewer than fifty of my original words," though An H. P. Lovecraft Encyclopedia reports that Lovecraft "kept as many of Price's conceptions as possible, as well as some of his language." Thus many of the central ideas of the story like 'Umr at-Tawil, the talk of mathematical planes and multiple facets of Randolph Carter throughout Time and Space come from Price, who was well read in neoplatonic thought, theosophy and the occult. Even the quote from the Necronomicon is mainly by Price in outline though put in more Lovecraftian language. The sub-plot about Yaddith was entirely Lovecraft's idea however. Hoffman Price's tales were oriental, and 'Umr at-Tawil was merely an Arab who had preternaturally long life in his draft.

In any case, Price was pleased with the result, writing that Lovecraft "was right of course in discarding all but the basic outline. I could only marvel that he had made so much of my inadequate and bungling start." The story appeared under both authors' bylines in the July 1934 issue of Weird Tales; Price's draft was published as "The Lord of Illusion" in Crypt of Cthulhu No. 10 in 1982.

Edward Guimont has proposed that an influence was Jack London's 1915 novel The Star Rover, which Lovecraft owned.

Reception
Lovecraft scholar Will Murray says of "Through the Gates of the Silver Key", "As a Dunsanian fantasy, the Price/Lovecraft collaboration is a failure; as a Mythos story, it is rich with ideas, but curiously diluted." In A Thousand Plateaus (1980), Gilles Deleuze and Félix Guattari called the story one of Lovecraft's masterpieces.

References

Sources
Robert M. Price, editor, Black Forbidden Things.

External links
 

1934 short stories
Cthulhu Mythos short stories
Fiction set in the 22nd century
Fantasy short stories
Collaborative short stories
Massachusetts in fiction
New Orleans in fiction
Short stories by H. P. Lovecraft
Works originally published in Weird Tales